A Neil Diamond Christmas is a 2022 collection of Christmas songs recorded by Neil Diamond. It was released on October 28, 2022, in four physical configurations: a 180-gram black vinyl double album set; a limited-edition gold opaque 180-gram vinyl double album set; two CDs; and one CD.

Curated by Diamond and remastered by his longtime engineer, Bernie Becker, the tracks on A Neil Diamond Christmas were originally released between 1994 and 2016 on Diamond's  albums The Christmas Album, The Christmas Album Volume II,  A Cherry Cherry Christmas, and Acoustic Christmas.

Track listing

Double album set

Double CD set

CD

Charts

References

External links
 Official website

2022 Christmas albums
Neil Diamond compilation albums
Christmas albums by American artists